The Siege: The Saga of Israel and Zionism is a 1986 book of political history written by the Irish statesman and intellectual Conor Cruise O'Brien.

Comparing Israel and Ireland, two states created in the 20th century by national liberation movements, O'Brien wrote, "Ireland is not a problem but a conflict. Conflicts don't have solutions. They have outcomes. That is also true of Israel's situation". In a later interview, he cautioned that while there are parallels between the political situation of Ireland and Israel, "you shouldn't push parallels too far."

O'Brien gives a clear-eyed, often witty, outsider's view of a seemingly-intractable conflict. For example, 1936–1939 Arab revolt in Palestine led to the 1937 Peel Commission report recommending partition, which the Arab summarily rejected. British Prime Minister Neville Chamberlain decided not to implement partition but also decided not to announce the decision because it would look as though Britain had backed down by the effective Arab use of force:

"So for nearly a year thereafter, the Arabs fought on, in order to kill a policy that was already dead, and the British fought them down, so as to be able to replace the dead policy, in a dignified way, with one they hoped would please those who were still trying to kill the dead one".

In his review of O'Brien's book, the Israeli diplomat Abba Eban pointed out that although "the siege" metaphor applies accurately to the early chapters covering the Zionist movement and early years of Israeli statehood, when Israel was a small, poor country surrounded by hostile enemies that had larger populations and much larger armies, but the situation of the fledgling Jewish State improved so dramatically after the 1967 Six-Day War that O'Brian found it "astounding".

References

1986 non-fiction books
History books about Zionism
Political books
Books about Israel